The Toyota NR engine family is a series of small inline four piston engines designed and manufactured by Toyota, with capacities between .

Common features of this series
The NR series uses aluminium engine blocks and cylinder head. The valve mechanism is equipped with 4-Valves per cylinder, DOHC, and implemented Toyota's Dual VVT-i and VVT-iW. It also uses multi-point or direct fuel injection. The 1NR, 2NR, 3NR, 4NR, 5NR, 6NR, and 7NR engines have Dual VVT-i standard and the 8NR engine has VVT-iW, enabling it to operate in the Otto cycle as well as a modified-Atkinson cycle to improve thermal efficiency.

1NR-FE
The 1NR-FE is a compact inline four piston engine featuring Stop & Start technology and Dual VVT-i. It was introduced into the European market in late 2008 with the Yaris XP9F. Improved engine performance combined with low emissions and fuel consumption was the principal aim during its development.

Advanced engineering has been applied throughout the 1NR-FE engine. Toyota engineers streamlined the engine's intake channel, used computer simulation to optimize airflow, smoothened all surfaces for less turbulence and rounded off all angles and sharp edges inside the engine. One of the key elements of the 1NR-FE engine is its piston design. Smaller and lighter than on the previous  unit, they are designed with a smaller contact area and use carbon ceramide, an advanced material commonly used in Formula One engineering, to reduce friction. The engine also features cooled exhaust gas recirculation (cold area specification models only) to reduce pumping losses and reduce  emissions.

Technical specifications of the engine:
 Displacement: 
 Bore x Stroke: 
 Max. Output: Euro 4 Version:  at 6000 rpm, Euro 5 Version:  at 6000 rpm, Indonesia Euro 3 Version:  at 6000 rpm, Malaysia version:  at 6000 rpm
 Max. Torque: Euro 4 Version:  at 3800 rpm, Euro 5 Version:  at 3800 rpm, Indonesia Euro 3 Version: ,  Malaysia Version:  at 4000 rpm
 Compression Ratio: 11.5:1;  Indonesia Euro 3 Version: 10.5:1
 Valve Mechanism: 16-valve DOHC, Chain Drive (with Dual VVT-i)
 Fuel Injection System: Multi-point fuel injection
 Emission Regulation: Euro 4 (Complies with Euro 5 after optimizations introduced in July 2010)
 Engine Service Mass (incl. coolant & oil): 
 Idling speed: 700 rpm
 Redline: 6200 rpm

Applications:

 Subaru Trezia
 Toyota Auris
 Toyota Corolla
 Toyota Corolla Axio (NRE160) (Japan)
 Toyota Etios (South America)
 Toyota iQ
 Toyota Passo
 Toyota Probox
 Toyota Ractis
 Toyota Urban Cruiser
 Toyota Verso-S
 Toyota Vios (XP150)
 Toyota Yaris (XP150)

1NR-VE

The new 1NR-VE engine was improvised by Daihatsu for the Toyota Avanza and Daihatsu Xenia, and then later used by Perodua for the Perodua Bezza, which is based on the 1.3-litre 1NR-FE.

Applications:
 Toyota Avanza/Daihatsu Xenia (F653, 2015–2021)
 Toyota Transmover (2016–present)
 Toyota Avanza/Daihatsu Xenia (W100, 2021–present)
 Perodua Bezza
 Perodua Myvi/Daihatsu Sirion (M800)
 Toyota Yaris/Vios (NGC101, 2022–present)

1NR-FBE
Fitted to the Toyota Etios and Yaris hatchback made in Brazil, available only as a flexfuel, 1.3 litre, with VVT-i. Replaced by a flexfuel version of the 1NR-FKE in 2016.

1NR-FKE
The 1NR-FKE is a variant of the 1NR-FE introduced in the second quarter of 2014. Toyota claims it will have a maximum thermal efficiency of 38 percent.
Major feature, this 1.3-litre gasoline engine is employing the Atkinson cycle like hybrid-dedicated Toyota engines. The maximum torque is lesser, but, this time, the maximum output is not reduced. Valves are driven with Variable Valve Timing-intelligent Electric VVT-iE. The intake port has a new shape that generates a strong vertical tumble flow.
Combustion is improved, and loss reduced. Toyota says that with idling stop and other functions, it will lead to fuel efficiency gains of approximately 15 percent.

Main differences between 1NR-FE :
 Max. output:  at 6000 rpm
 Max. torque:  at 4400 rpm
 Max. thermal efficiency : 38%
 Expansion ratio: 13.5:1
 Valve mechanism: VVT-iE

Applications:
Toyota Etios (Brazil only)
Toyota Yaris (Brazil only)
 Toyota Vitz after April 2014
 Subaru Trezia after May 2014

2NR-FE

A  variant of the NR series engine, first introduced in the fourth quarter of 2010 for the Toyota Etios. It is the first new engine Toyota developed for over 8 years without VVT-i made to lower costs for the Toyota Etios. A new innovation was introduced to this engine with the integration of the exhaust manifold into the cylinder head to reduce emissions. A Dual VVT-i equipped version was later introduced and first used in Toyota Avanza and in many 1.5L models in the Asian market from the 2017 model year.

Technical specifications of the engine:
 Displacement: 
 Bore x Stroke: 
 Max. output: 
  at 5600 rpm (w/o Dual VVT-i)
  at 6000 rpm (with Dual VVT-i)
 Max. torque:
  at 3000 rpm (w/o Dual VVT-i)
  at 4200 rpm (with Dual VVT-i)
 Compression ratio: 11.5:1; Indonesian Euro 3 version: 10.5:1
 Idling speed: 700 rpm
 Redline: 6200 rpm

Applications:
 Toyota Etios
 Toyota Sienta (XP170)
 Toyota Vios (XP150, 2016–present) 
 Toyota Limo (2016–2017, Indonesia)
 Toyota Yaris (XP150, 2016–present)

2NR-VE

Based on the 1.5-litre 2NR-FE engine, The 2NR-VE was adapted by Daihatsu for its products and it's also used by Toyota for their products based on Daihatsu New Global Architecture (DNGA). An idle stop-start system is introduced for the Perodua Myvi and Toyota Rush (since 2021) to enhance fuel efficiency.

Max. output:
  at 6000 rpm

Max. torque:
  at 4200 rpm

Compression Ratio: 11.5:1; Indonesian Euro 3 version: 10.5:1

Applications:
 Toyota Avanza/Daihatsu Xenia (F654, 2015–2021)
 Toyota Avanza/Daihatsu Xenia (W101, 2021–present)
 Toyota Veloz (W101/W151, 2021–present)/Perodua Alza (W151, 2022–present)
 Daihatsu Terios/Toyota Rush/Perodua Aruz
 Perodua Myvi (M800)
 Toyota TownAce/Daihatsu Gran Max/Mazda Bongo (Japan, 2020–present)
 Toyota Yaris/Vios (NGC102, 2022–present)

2NR-FBE
A flex fuel engine for the Etios in Brazil. It can run on gasoline or any mixture of gasoline and ethanol, up to full ethanol (E100).

Main differences between 2NR-FE:
 Max. Power output:  at 5600 rpm
Max. Torque:  at 3100 rpm

Applications:
Toyota Etios (Brazil only)
Toyota Yaris (Brazil only)
Toyota Vios (2016–present)

2NR-FKE
Implements variable valve timing system VVT-iE and engine operation by Miller / Atkinson cycle.

Main differences between 2NR-FE :
 Max. Output:  at 6000 rpm
 Max. Torque:  at 4400 rpm
 Compression ratio: 13.5:1

Applications:
 Toyota Corolla Axio (April 2015 – present)
 Toyota Porte/Spade (XP140) (2015–2020)
 Toyota Sienta (Japan, 2015–present)
 Toyota Yaris (Europe, 2017–2020)

3NR-FE/3NR-VE

A  variant of the NR series engine. First introduced in the second quarter of 2011 for the Etios Liva. Toyota later implemented Dual VVT-i mechanism and increased the compression ratio to 11.5:1 for Toyota Yaris models (Thailand).

Some technologies used in the Daihatsu-made 3NR-VE engine are:
 The application of intake valve type roller rocker arm, which reduces the friction produced when the camshaft is running.
 The application of Dual VVT-i system, which adjusts timing on both intake and exhaust camshafts.
 Improved cylinder head design.
 Longer intake valve, which improves lower-end torque.

Technical specifications of the engine:
 Displacement: 
 Bore x Stroke: 
 Max. Output:  at 5600 rpm /  at 6000 rpm (with Dual VVT-i)
 Max. Torque:  at 3100 rpm /  at 4200 rpm (with Dual VVT-i)
 Compression ratio 11.5:1; Indonesia Euro 3 Version: 10.3:1

Applications:
 Toyota Etios
 Toyota Yaris (XP150) (Thailand, 2013–2019)
 Toyota Yaris Ativ (XP150) (Thailand, 2017–2019)
 Toyota Yaris Ativ (AC100) (Thailand, 2022–present, as 3NR-VE w/Dual VVT-iE)
 Toyota Calya/Daihatsu Sigra (as 3NR-VE w/Dual VVT-i)
 Toyota Agya/Daihatsu Ayla (as 3NR-VE w/Dual VVT-i)

3NR-FKE
Implements variable valve timing system VVT-iE and engine operation by Miller / Atkinson cycle.

Main differences between 3NR-FE :
 Max. Output:  at 6000 rpm
 Max. Torque:  at 4400 rpm
 Expansion ratio: 13.5:1
  output: 99 g/km
 Fuel consumption: 

Applications:
 Toyota Yaris (XP150) (Thailand, 2019–present)
 Toyota Yaris Ativ (XP150) (Thailand, 2019–2022)

4NR-FE
A  variant of the NR series engine. First introduced for the third generation Toyota Vios.

Technical specifications of the engine:
 Displacement: 
 Max. Output:  at 6000 rpm
 Max. Torque:  at 4200 rpm

Applications:
 Toyota Vios (NCP150R) (China only)

5NR-FE
A  variant of the NR series engine. First introduced for the third generation Toyota Vios.

Technical specifications of the engine:
 Displacement: 
 Max. Output:  at 6000 rpm
 Max. Torque:  at 4200 rpm

Applications:
 Toyota Vios (NCP150R) (China only)

6NR-FE
A  variant of the NR series engine. First introduced for the third generation Toyota Yaris.

Technical specifications of the engine:
 Displacement: 
 Max. Output:  at 6000 rpm
 Max. Torque:  at 4200 rpm

Applications:
 Toyota Yaris (XP150) (China only)

7NR-FE
A  variant of the NR series engine. First introduced for the third generation Toyota Yaris.

Technical specifications of the engine:
 Displacement: 
 Max. Output:  at 6000 rpm
 Max. Torque:  at 4200 rpm

Applications:
 Toyota Yaris (XP150) (China only)

8NR-FTS

A  turbocharged variant of the NR series engine. First introduced in the Toyota Auris in 2015. It uses direct injection.

Technical specifications:
 Displacement: 
 Bore x Stroke: 
 Max. Output:  at 5200 rpm
 Max. Torque:  at 1500 rpm
 Max. thermal efficiency: > 36%
 Compression ratio: 10.0:1
 Valve Mechanism: VVT-iW

Applications:
 Toyota Auris (E180)
 Toyota C-HR
Toyota Corolla (E210)

9NR-FTS
A version of 8NR-FTS built for Chinese-market Corolla/Levin.

Technical specifications:
 Displacement: 
 Bore x Stroke: 
 Max. Output:  at 5200 rpm
 Max. Torque:  at 1500 rpm
 Max. thermal efficiency: > 36%
 Compression ratio: 10.0:1
 Valve Mechanism: VVT-iW

Applications:
 Toyota Corolla/Levin (E180, China)
 Toyota Corolla/Levin (E210, China)

References

NR
Straight-four engines
Gasoline engines by model